Pick Up the Mic is a documentary film, released in 2006, which profiles the underground homo hop scene, which is a subgenre of hip hop that includes gay, lesbian, bisexual and transgender artists. The film was directed by Alex Hinton.

The documentary had its premiere at the 2005 Toronto International Film Festival. Subsequently, the film screened at other film festivals around the world. An edited version aired nationally in the United States on the Logo cable television channel.

Though homophobia is a phenomenon commonly laid at the feet of mainstream hip hop, pop culture's relationship to it has also been shaped by white middle class LGBT communities' covert and overt racism and internalized homophobia.

As a result, the attendant conversations in LGBT and straight mainstream media around the subject tend to gravitate toward the speculative (Queen Pen's 1998 single "Your Girlfriend") and the apocryphal (the brief career of self-proclaimed "gay rapper" Caushun, who was the subject of a flurry of mainstream press from 2001 to 2003, yet failed to release an album or single through his reported record deal with Kimora Lee Simmons' Baby Phat imprint).

Homohop is a growing subgenre of aggressive pro-gay lyrics directly confronting the perceived homophobia of mainstream rap. It is a significant underground gay hip hop movement, spearheaded by many of the artists profiled in Pick Up the Mic. The performance footage in the documentary was shot at the PeaceOUT World Homo Hop Festival in Oakland, California between 2002 and 2004, and Peace Out East, a sister festival in New York City curated by Judge "Dutchboy" Muscat and Shante "Paradigm" Smalls. All of the artists featured in Pick Up the Mic have released multiple independent recordings and have toured the United States and internationally over the past several years. Katastrophe, Deep Dickollective and Scream Club have been among the most prolific, with the Scream Club making several tours across Europe in recent years, where they have developed a cult-like following.

Artists 
 Juba Kalamka
 Deep Dickollective
 Dutchboy
 Tori Fixx
 Deadlee
 Tim'm T. West
 JB Rap
 JenRO
 Katastrophe
 Marcus Rene Van
 Miss Money
 Paradigm
 Aggracyst
 QBoy
 Cazwell
 Johnny Dangerous
 God-Des
 Tina G (aka She of God-Des and She)
 Scream Club
 Soce, the elemental wizard

See also 
 Banjee

References

External links 
 Pick Up the Mic
 

2006 films
American documentary films
Documentary films about LGBT topics
LGBT hip hop
Documentary films about hip hop music and musicians
2006 LGBT-related films
Rhino Films films
African-American LGBT-related films
African-American films
American LGBT-related films
2000s English-language films
2000s American films